Karlous Bernard Miller (born April 2, 1983) is an American comedian, actor and rapper. He began his comedy career in Atlanta, Georgia and is widely known for his successful podcast/comedy tour The 85 South Show, along with being a cast member on MTV's comedy improv series, Wild 'n Out and his notorious "Wildstyle" battles with fellow cast member, DC Young Fly and Chico Bean.

Early life

Miller was born in Oxford, Mississippi. He was born into a large blended family, having five siblings. He was a firefighter before moving to Atlanta, to pursue a career as a stand-up comedian in 2005. Karlous mainly started with Quincy Bond's Phat Comedy group in 2008. This started his career in 2010.

Career

His first television appearance was on Robert Townsends: Partners in Crime - The New Generation. He has since appeared in multiple TV shows such as Hell Date, Yo Momma, Bill Bellamy's Who's Got Jokes, The Mo'nique Show, Off the Chain, Comic View, Last Comic Standing and Wild 'n Out.

Miller has also been featured in written publications for MTV, EarHustle411, Oxford Citizen along with V-103's Frank and Wanda morning television/radio show and Atlanta's Hot 107.9.

Other media

Miller is said to have a passion for music, most notably evident in his battle raps against Chico Bean on Wild 'n Out. This would open doors for him to work with numerous musicians such as Gucci Mane, Case, Dem Franchize Boyz, Granddaddy Souf, Big Oomp, Big K.R.I.T, Jermaine Dupri, T.I. and many more.

In 2015, Miller, DC Young Fly and later, Chico, started their own podcast, called The 85 South Show, where they speak on various topics,  interact with the audience, and freestyle on songs.

In October 2018, Miller confirmed on the Breakfast Club that he won't appear in the upcoming season of Wild'n Out, and that he had been fired. However, he was eventually brought back to the show per fans requests.

Influences 

Miller stated his comedic influences consists of Redd Foxx, Bernie Mac, Mo'Nique, Richard Pryor, Eddie Murphy, Cedric the Entertainer and Steve Harvey. Miller also attributes his comedic influence to his family and acknowledges them in his boisterous and edgy humor.

Personal life 

Miller was in a relationship with fellow comedian Ashima Franklin.  They welcomed their son in December 2008. Miller co-parents his son with Franklin, despite their relationship ending.

Filmography

Film

Television

References

External links 
 
 
  
  
  
 

Living people
1983 births
21st-century American male actors
21st-century American comedians
African-American male comedians
American rappers
American male rappers
African-American male actors
American male comedians
African-American stand-up comedians
American stand-up comedians
American male film actors
Musicians from Mississippi
American male television actors
Male actors from Mississippi
Comedians from Mississippi
21st-century American rappers
African-American male rappers
21st-century American male musicians
21st-century African-American musicians
20th-century African-American people